This is an incomplete, chronological list of films produced in the Khmer language. Most films are related to the Cinema of Cambodia, but it may include films which have been partly produced in other countries but still retain Cambodian links.

For an alphabetical listing, see :Category:Cambodian films. Not all Cambodian films are listed and many of the films produced between 1965 and 1975 were destroyed during the Khmer Rouge years.

1960s 
Kbone Chivet (1962)...Madam Dy Saveth 1st film
Chet Madai (1963) oldest existing Khmer film discovered 
Apsara (1965)...King Sihanouk's 1st film
Pao Chouk Sar (1967)
Puthisen Neang Kongrey (1967)
Tep Sodachan(1968)
Thavary Meas Bong (1969)

1970s 
Sovann Pancha (1970)...known as Vann Vannak's only surviving film
The Snake King's Wife (1970) The most popular Cambodian movie of all time directed by Tea Lim Koun and was released in Cambodia for a second term The Snake King's Wife Part 2 in 1972.
Kropeu Charavan (1972)
Orn Euy Srey Orn (1972)
Pko Lon Deum Chnam (1972)
 (1972)
Panjapor Tevi (1973)
Chnam Oun 16 (1974)-known for the famous Rock and Roll song "Sweet 16" by Ros Serey Sothea
Pous Trung Oun Tov (1975)-known as the last existing Khmer film before the Khmer Rouge

1980s 
The Forced Labor Of Angkar Leu (1979–1980)
Kone Euy Madai Ahp (1980 or 1984)
Chet Chang Cham (1984)
Tears In A Quiet Purple Evening (1987)...Tep Rundaro's debut film

1990s 

Last Colonel Savath (1992)
Rice People (1994)
Peasants In Distress (1994)
Promat Promaong (1994)
Picheyvongsa (1996)
Jeat Satrey (1997)...Cambodia's 1st acknowledged TV series and Pich Soporn's last film
Bopha Pailin (1998)...Chorn Chan Leakenna debut film

2000s 

Techo Domden (2000)
The Snake King's Child (2001)...Internationally known sequel to the 1970 film, a joint production between Cambodia and Thailand
Cheam Anata (2002)...Actors Chea Yuthon and Saom Vansodany's life during the Khmer Rouge
Tuk Jet Mdai (2002)...Dy Saveth returns to acting for the first time in a long time
Min Yoke Te Pdei Jass, Saóp Nass Pdei Kmeng (2003)
Tum and Teav (2003)
Good Husband/Pdey Laór (2003)
3 Ace (2004)
Ah Lev (2004)
Neang Neat (2004)
Moronak Meada (2004)
Mr. Mao (2005)
Neang Macha (2005)
The Blind and the Crippled (2005)
The Crocodile (2005)
Mjass Bomnul Kam (2006)
The Snake King's Grandchild (2006)
Staying Single When (2007)...KMF's 1st featured film 
Heart Talk (2008)
Pume Neak Klahan (2009)
The Twin Diamonds (2009)

2010s 

Lost Loves (2010)
Kiles (2010)
Two Shadows (2011)
The Uninvited Ancestor (2011) 
The Road to Freedom (2011) (US Film)
Techoyut (2012)
Red Khmer (2013)  Directed by Brendan Moriarty
Where I Go (2013)  Directed by Neang Kavich
The Last Reel (2014)  Directed by Kulikar Sotho
Poppy Goes to Hollywood (2016)  Directed by Sok Visal
Diamond Island (2016)  Directed by Davy Chou
Jailbreak (2017)  Directed by Jimmy Henderson
Chantrea (2017) 
Kamnat Het Neang Neath (2017) Cambodia's Horror movie 
Luong Preah Sdach Korn ហ្លួងព្រះស្តេចកន (2017) Directed by Moav Ayouth 
First They Killed My Father (film) (2017) Directed by Angelina Jolie
In the Life of Music (2018)

2020s
Fathers (2020)
Karmalink (2023)

See also 
 List of Khmer Soap Operas
 List of Khmer entertainment companies
 List of Khmer film actors
 List of Khmer film directors

External links 
 Films from Cambodia at the Internet Movie Database
 Khmer-language films at the Internet Movie Database
 Filmography of Norodom Sihanouk
 Best Movies Related to Cambodia

Khmer